Llosa may refer to:

 La Llosa, a village in Castellón, Valencia, Spain
 La Llosa, a former Roman villa and archaeological site in Cambrils, Catalonia, Spain
 Claudia Llosa Bueno (born 1976), Peruvian film director and writer
 Frederick Cooper Llosa (born 1939), Peruvian architect and professor
 Luis Llosa (born 1951), Peruvian film director
 Ricardo Pau-Llosa (born 1954), Cuban-American writer
 Vargas Llosa, a Peruvian surname
 Marquess of Vargas Llosa, a Spanish title of nobility